Mark Richards "M.R." Clapp (March 3, 1803 – April 23, 1891) was an American farmer and territorial legislator.

Background 
Born in Boston, Massachusetts, Clapp settled in Milford, Wisconsin Territory, in 1840. Clapp was a farmer. In 1846, he served in the Wisconsin Territorial House of Representatives. His brother was Joseph Dorr Clapp who served in the Wisconsin State Senate.

References

1803 births
1891 deaths
Politicians from Boston
People from Milford, Wisconsin
Farmers from Wisconsin
Members of the Wisconsin Territorial Legislature
19th-century American politicians